Gingsanglek Tor.Laksong is a Muay Thai fighter.

Titles and accomplishments

Omnoi Stadium
 2020 Siam Omnoi Stadium 135 lbs Champion (one defense)

Awards
 2015 Siam Kela Young Fighter of the Year

Fight record

|-  style="background:#fbb;"
| 2023-02-24|| Loss ||align=left| Kongthoranee Sor.Sommai || ONE Friday Fights 6, Lumpinee Stadium || Bangkok, Thailand || KO (Left hook) || 2 ||1:02

|-  style="background:#cfc;"
| 2022-12-09 || Win||align=left| Yodkitsada Yuthachonburi || Rajadamnern World Series || Bangkok, Thailand || TKO (Doctor stoppage) || 2 ||
|-  style="background:#fbb;"
| 2022-11-09 || Loss ||align=left| Yodtongthai Sor.Sommai ||Muay Thai Palangmai, Rajadamnern Stadium || Bangkok, Thailand || DQ (kicked a downed opponent)|| 2||
|-  style="background:#cfc"
| 2022-09-23 || Win ||align=left| Josiah ChokdeeGym || Rajadamnern World Series || Bangkok, Thailand|| TKO (Elbows) || 2 || 0:54
|-  style="text-align:center; background:#cfc;"
| 2022-08-19 || Win ||align=left| Nur VenumMuayThai|| Rajadamnern World Series || Bangkok, Thailand || Decision|| 3 ||3:00
|-  style="background:#fbb;"
| 2022-03-20 || Loss ||align=left| Kongthoranee Sor.Sommai ||Chang Muaythai Kiatphet, Rajadamnern Stadium || Bangkok, Thailand ||TKO (Doctor stoppage)||  5||
|-
! style=background:white colspan=9 |
|-  style="background:#cfc;"
| 2022-02-13|| Win ||align=left| Songkom Bangkokalaiyon || Chang MuayThai Kiatpetch Amarin Super Fight, Rajadamnern Stadium||  Bangkok, Thailand || KO (low kick)||3 ||

|-  style="background:#fbb;"
| 2021-12-23|| Loss ||align=left| Yok Parunchai || Ruamponkon Songkhla ||  Songkhla, Thailand || Decision ||5  ||3:00 

|-  style="background:#fbb;"
| 2021-11-14|| Loss||align=left| Nakrob Fairtex || Channel 7 Stadium||  Bangkok, Thailand || TKO||5 ||

|-  style="background:#cfc;"
| 2021-04-24|| Win||align=left| Kongthoranee Sor.Sommai || Omnoi Boxing Stadium ||  Samut Sakhon, Thailand || Decision|| 5 || 3:00
|-
! style=background:white colspan=9 |
|-  style="background:#cfc;"
| 2020-11-17|| Win ||align=left| Yodkitsada Yuthachonburi || Sor.Sommai|| Nakhon Ratchasima, Thailand ||Decision ||5 ||3:00
|-  style="background:#cfc;"
| 2020-09-26|| Win||align=left| Phetmorakot Teeded99 || Omnoi Boxing Stadium ||  Samut Sakhon, Thailand || TKO (Low Kicks)|| 2 ||
|-
! style=background:white colspan=9 |
|-  style="background:#cfc;"
| 2020-02-24|| Win||align=left| Luknimit Singklongsi|| Rajadamnern Stadium || Bangkok, Thailand ||Decision || 5 || 3:00
|-  style="background:#fbb;"
| 2020-01-08||Loss ||align=left| Thanonchai Thanakorngym || Rajadamnern Stadium || Bangkok, Thailand ||KO (Left Straight) ||3||
|-  style="background:#cfc;"
| 2019-10-17|| Win||align=left| Salatan ToyotaRayong|| Rajadamnern Stadium || Bangkok, Thailand ||KO || 4 ||
|-  style="background:#cfc;"
| 2019-08-07|| Win||align=left| Suriyanlek Aor.Bor.Tor.Kampee|| Rajadamnern Stadium || Bangkok, Thailand ||Decision || 5 || 3:00
|-  style="background:#fbb;"
| 2019-06-06|| Loss ||align=left| Apiwat Sor.Somnuek || Rajadamnern Stadium ||Bangkok, Thailand || Decision || 5 || 3:00
|-  style="background:#cfc;"
| 2019-04-11|| Win||align=left| Phetkriangkrai Tor.Silachai|| Rajadamnern Stadium || Bangkok, Thailand ||KO (High Kick) || 5 ||
|-  style="background:#fbb;"
| 2018-06-21|| Loss ||align=left| Phetpangan Mor.Ratanabandit || Rajadamnern Stadium ||Bangkok, Thailand || Decision || 5 || 3:00
|-  style="background:#cfc;"
| 2018-02-17|| Win||align=left| Samernai WorPor.AngThong|| Omnoi stadium || Samut Sakhon, Thailand ||KO || 2 ||
|-  style="background:#fbb;"
| 2017-11-02|| Loss||align=left| Chocknamchai Gor.Suwantat|| Rajadamnern Stadium || Bangkok, Thailand ||Decision || 5 || 3:00
|-  style="background:#fbb;"
| 2017-09-06|| Loss||align=left| Pichitchai P.K.Saenchai || Rajadamnern Stadium || Bangkok, Thailand ||KO || 4 ||
|-  style="background:#cfc;"
| 2017-07-13|| Win||align=left| Phayakmongkol Teeded99 || Rajadamnern Stadium || Bangkok, Thailand ||KO || 5 ||
|-  style="background:#fbb;"
| 2017-06-07|| Loss||align=left| Kumandoi Petcharoenvit || Rajadamnern Stadium || Bangkok, Thailand ||Decision || 5 || 3:00
|-  style="background:#cfc;"
| 2017-05-03|| Win||align=left| Roicheng Singmawin || Rajadamnern Stadium || Bangkok, Thailand || Decision|| 5 || 3:00
|-  style="background:#fbb;"
| 2017-03-30|| Loss ||align=left| Saoek Sitchefboontham || Rajadamnern Stadium || Bangkok, Thailand || Decision|| 5 || 3:00
|-  style="background:#fbb;"
| 2017-02-09|| Loss||align=left| Saoek Sitchefboontham || Rajadamnern Stadium || Bangkok, Thailand || Decision|| 5 || 3:00
|-  style="background:#fbb;"
| 2016-12-21|| Loss ||align=left| Puenkon Tor.Surat || Rajadamnern Stadium || Bangkok, Thailand || KO (Left Knee to the Body) || 4 ||  
|-
! style=background:white colspan=9 |
|-  style="background:#cfc;"
| 2016-11-30|| Win||align=left| Phetsuphan Por.Daorungruang || Rajadamnern Stadium || Bangkok, Thailand || TKO (Referee Stoppage) || 4||
|-  style="background:#fbb;"
| 2016-10-13|| Loss||align=left| Puenkon Tor.Surat || Rajadamnern Stadium || Bangkok, Thailand || Decision || 5 || 3:00
|-  style="background:#cfc;"
| 2016-09-14|| Win||align=left| Phetmuangchon Por.Suantong || Rajadamnern Stadium || Bangkok, Thailand || Decision || 5 || 3:00
|-  style="background:#cfc;"
| 2016-08-24|| Win ||align=left| Witthayalek Musaphanmai || Rajadamnern Stadium || Bangkok, Thailand || Decision || 5 || 3:00
|-  style="background:#fbb;"
| 2016-08-04|| Loss||align=left| Phetmuangchon Por.Suantong || Rajadamnern Stadium || Bangkok, Thailand || Decision || 5 || 3:00
|-  style="background:#fbb;"
| 2016-07-05|| Loss||align=left| Priewpak Sor.Jor.Vichitpedriw || Lumpinee Stadium || Bangkok, Thailand || Decision || 5 || 3:00
|-  style="background:#c5d2ea;"
| 2016-06-09|| Draw||align=left| Phetmuangnon Jitmuangon || Lumpinee Stadium || Bangkok, Thailand || Decision || 5 || 3:00
|-  style="background:#fbb;"
| 2016-06-09|| Loss||align=left| Saiyanlek P.k.Saenchai || Rajadamnern Stadium || Bangkok, Thailand || Decision || 5 || 3:00
|-  style="background:#cfc;"
| 2016-02-24|| Win ||align=left| Witthayalek Musaphanmai || Rajadamnern Stadium || Bangkok, Thailand || KO (Left Elbow)|| 2 ||
|-  style="background:#cfc;"
| 2015-12-19|| Win ||align=left| Detrir Por.Telakun|| Rajadamnern Stadium || Bangkok, Thailand || Decision || 5 || 3:00
|-  style="background:#cfc;"
| 2015-11-19|| Win ||align=left| Suayai Chor.Hapayak|| Rajadamnern Stadium || Bangkok, Thailand || KO (Left Elbow)|| 3 ||
|-  style="background:#cfc;"
| 2015-10-07|| Win ||align=left| Chaiyo Petchyindee Academy|| Rajadamnern Stadium || Bangkok, Thailand || Decision || 5 || 3:00
|-  style="background:#cfc;"
| 2015-09-04|| Win ||align=left| Rakhangtong Mor.Chombueng Rajabhat || Rajadamnern Stadium || Bangkok, Thailand || KO (Left Elbow)|| 3 ||
|-  style="background:#fbb;"
| 2015-07-29|| Loss ||align=left| Ruangsaknoi Sitniwat || Rajadamnern Stadium || Bangkok, Thailand || Disqualification||  ||
|-  style="background:#cfc;"
| 2015-06-24|| Win ||align=left| Denkraingkrai Kiatphontip || Rajadamnern Stadium || Bangkok, Thailand || Decision || 5 || 3:00
|-  style="background:#cfc;"
| 2015-04-30|| Win ||align=left| Chatpichit Sor.Jor.Vichitpedriw || Onesongchai, Rajadamnern Stadium || Bangkok, Thailand || KO || 4 ||
|-  style="background:#cfc;"
| 2015-03-02|| Win ||align=left| Jatukam Petchrungruang || Rajadamnern Stadium || Bangkok, Thailand || Decision || 5 || 3:00  
|-
! style=background:white colspan=9 |
|-  style="background:#cfc;"
| 2015-01-28|| Win ||align=left| Bonpukbow Mor.Rattanabandit || Rajadamnern Stadium || Bangkok, Thailand || Decision || 5 || 3:00
|-  style="background:#cfc;"
| 2014-12-31|| Win ||align=left| Kaodeng Sujibamikiew || Rajadamnern Stadium || Bangkok, Thailand || KO || 2 ||
|-  style="background:#cfc;"
| 2014-12-01|| Win ||align=left| Denkraingkrai Kiatphontip || Rajadamnern Stadium || Bangkok, Thailand || Decision || 5 || 3:00
|-  style="background:#cfc;"
| 2014-10-23|| Win ||align=left| Denkraingkrai Kiatphontip || Rajadamnern Stadium || Bangkok, Thailand || Decision || 5 || 3:00
|-  style="background:#fbb;"
| 2014-06-02|| Loss ||align=left| Ruangsaknoi Sitniwat || Rajadamnern Stadium || Bangkok, Thailand || Decision|| 5 || 3:00
|-  style="background:#cfc;"
| 2014-05-07|| Win||align=left| Suvarnabhumi STD Transport|| Rajadamnern Stadium || Bangkok, Thailand || Decision|| 5 || 3:00
|-  style="background:#cfc;"
| 2014-03-14|| Win||align=left| Ruangsaknoi Sitniwat || Lumpinee Stadium || Bangkok, Thailand || Decision|| 5 || 3:00
|-
| colspan=9 | Legend:

References

Gingsanglek Tor.Laksong
ONE Championship kickboxers 
Living people
2000 births
Gingsanglek Tor.Laksong